Rauwerderhem is a former municipality in the province of Friesland. It existed until 1984. Rauwerderhem is now named Boarnsterhim (City: Irnsum).

Former municipalities of Friesland